The marquises (also marquesses or margraves) of Saluzzo were the medieval feudal rulers city of Saluzzo (today part of Piedmont, Italy) and its countryside from 1175 to 1549. Originally counts, the family received in feudum the city from the margrave of Turin, Ulric Manfred. It passed to the margrave of Susa, of the del Vasto family of Savona, and, in 1175, it was raised to margravial status by the Emperor Frederick I. In 1549, it was annexed to France during the Italian Wars. It remained under French control until 1601, when it was ceded to the Duke of Savoy in exchange for Bresse and surrounding territories.

Marquises 

 Manfred I (1125–1175)
 Manfred II (1175–1215)
 Manfred III (1215–1244)
 Thomas I (1244–1296)
 Manfred IV (1296–1330)
Manfred V, civil war with his brother until 1332
Frederick I, civil war with his brother until 1332
 Frederick I (1332–1336)
 Thomas II (1336–1357)
 Frederick II (1357–1396)
 Thomas III (1396–1416)
 Ludovico I (1416–1475)
 Ludovico II (1475–1504)
 Michele Antonio (1504–1528)
 Gian Ludovico (1528–1529, d.1563), deposed
 Francesco Ludovico I (1529–1537)
 Gian Gabriele (1537–1548)

See also
Marquisate of Saluzzo

Saluzzo marquesses